Fardin Hakimi (Dari: فردین حکیمی; born 15 January 1995) is an Afghan footballer who plays as an attacking midfielder for Bangladeshi club  Arambagh KS and the Afghan national team.

Career

With Oqaban Hindukush F.C., he secured the league runners-up trophy in 2014 before leaving the club at the end of the year. Fardin has earned approbation for his performances in the Afghan Premier League, getting called up to accompany Afghanistan in the 2015 SAFF Championship, making two appearances.

Fardin Hakimi has represented Afghanistan at numerous and multiple levels composed of the U-17, U-19, and U-23 teams respectively.

References

External links
 au.eurosport.com Profile at Eurosport
 

1995 births
Living people
Afghan footballers
Afghanistan international footballers
Association football midfielders
Shaheen Asmayee F.C. players